Inglewood Golf Club is a private golf club in the northwest United States in Kenmore, Washington. Founded  in 1919 and opened for play in July 1921, it is located at the north end of Lake Washington, northeast of Seattle.

Inglewood was designed by A. Vernon "Mac" Macan, a leading golf course architect of the time. Born in Dublin, Ireland, in 1882, Macan was a highly educated man, attending Shrewsbury and studying law at Trinity College. In 1908, Macan emigrated to Canada, and was the architect for many golf courses in British Columbia and the northwestern U.S., including Royal Colwood, Broadmoor, Fircrest, Columbia Edgewater, Hillcrest, and Colwood National.

Tour events held at Inglewood include the PGA Tour's Seattle Open (1936, 1963, 1965), and the GTE Northwest Classic (1987–1995) on the senior tour.

Tour events

References

External links

Golf clubs and courses in Washington (state)
1919 establishments in Washington (state)
Golf clubs and courses designed by A. V. Macan